Aleksandar Simeonov (born 25 April 1963) is a retired Bulgarian bobsledder. He competed in the two-man and four-man events at the 1988 Winter Olympics and placed 22nd–24th.

References

1963 births
Living people
Bobsledders at the 1988 Winter Olympics
Olympic bobsledders of Bulgaria
Bulgarian male bobsledders